Adoum is both a surname and a given name. Notable people with the name include:

Jorge Enrique Adoum (1926–2009), Ecuadorian writer
Mahamat Ali Adoum (born 1947), Chadian politician
Adoum Younousmi (born 1962), Chadian politician
Adoum Alifa (born 1972), Cameroonian Davis Cup tennis player
Abakar Adoum (born 1984), Chadian football player

See also
Miamete Adoum, village in Central African Republic
Adouma, ethnic group in Gabon

Surnames of Chadian origin
Surnames of Cameroonian origin